Ilyinka is a rural locality (a selo) and the administrative center of Ilyinsky Selsoviet, Shipunovsky District, Altai Krai, Russia. The population was 315 as of 2013. There are 7 streets.

Geography 
Ilyinka is located 45 km SSE of Shipunovo (the district's administrative centre) by road. Yeltsovka is the nearest rural locality.

References 

Rural localities in Shipunovsky District